Dag Johan Haugerud  (born 30 December 1964) is a Norwegian librarian, novelist, screenwriter and film director.

His novels include Noe med natur (1999), Den som er veldig sterk, må også være veldig snill (2002), Hva jeg betyr (2011) and Enkle atonale stykker for barn (2016).

He has created several short films, including Utukt from 2000 and Trøbbel from 2006.

His first feature film was the 2012 film I Belong (Som du ser meg), which won Amanda Awards in 2013 for best film, best script (Haugerud), best director (Haugerud) and best actress (Laila Goody).

He directed the 2014 film , featuring Andrea Bræin Hovig as "the teacher".

References

1964 births
Living people
Norwegian male novelists
20th-century Norwegian novelists
21st-century Norwegian novelists
Norwegian film directors
Norwegian screenwriters
20th-century Norwegian male writers
21st-century Norwegian male writers